Tibracana is a genus of moths of the family Erebidae. The genus was erected by Francis Walker in 1866.

Species
Tibracana gnoma (Schaus, 1906) Brazil (São Paulo)
Tibracana xanthialis Walker, [1866] Brazil

References

Herminiinae